Hywind Scotland is the world's first commercial wind farm using floating wind turbines, situated  off Peterhead, Scotland. 
The farm has five 6 MW Siemens direct-drive turbines on Hywind floating monopiles, with a total capacity of 30 MW. It is operated by Hywind (Scotland) Limited, a joint venture of Equinor (75%) and Masdar (25%).

Equinor (then: Statoil) launched the world's first operational deep-water floating large-capacity wind turbine, the US$71 million 2.3 MW Hywind ($31/W), in 2009.

In 2015, the company received permission to install the wind farm in Scotland, in an attempt at reducing the cost relative to the original Hywind, in accordance with the Scottish Government's commitment for cost reduction. Manufacturing for the project, with a budgeted cost of NOK2 billion (£152m), started in 2016 in Spain, Norway and Scotland. The turbines were assembled at Stord in Norway in summer 2017 using the Saipem 7000 floating crane, and the finished turbines were moved to near Peterhead. Three suction anchors hold each turbine. Hywind Scotland was commissioned in October 2017. 

While cost was reduced compared to the very expensive Hywind One at $31m/MW, it still came with a final capital cost of £264m, or £8.8m/MW, approximately three times the capital cost of fixed offshore windfarms. Measured by unit cost, its levelized cost of energy (LCoE) is then £180/MWh ($248/MWh), about three times the typical LCoE of a fixed offshore wind farm at £55/MWh ($75.7/MWh). The high cost is partly compensated by £165.27/MWh from Renewable Obligation Certificates.

In its first 5 years of operation the facility has averaged a capacity factor of 54%, sometimes in 10 meter waves.

The subsequent 94 MW Hywind Tampen (with concrete floating foundations) was under construction at the Snorre and Gullfaks oil fields in Norway in 2022.

See also
Offshore wind power

References

2017 establishments in Scotland
2017 in technology
Equinor
Wind farms in Scotland
Offshore wind farms in the North Sea
Floating wind turbines
Energy infrastructure completed in 2017